John Gardiner (born 2 April 1958 in Glasgow) is a Scottish former footballer who played most of his career with Motherwell. He historically managed Formartine United. Gardiner's son Ross, like his father, also played for Dundee United.

External links

1958 births
Living people
Footballers from Glasgow
Scottish footballers
Aberdeen F.C. players
Dundee United F.C. players
Airdrieonians F.C. (1878) players
Forfar Athletic F.C. players
Motherwell F.C. players
Montrose F.C. players
Peterhead F.C. players
Scottish Football League players
Association football goalkeepers
Huntly F.C. players